Indianapolis News Building, also known as the Goodman Jewelers Building, is a historic commercial building located at Indianapolis, Indiana. It was designed by architect Jarvis Hunt (1863–1941) and built in 1909–1910. It is a ten-story, rectangular, Neo-Gothic style brick and terra cotta building. It is three bays wide and 10 bays deep. The top floor features a corbelled terra cotta balcony, Tudor-like window openings, and a Gothic parapet. It is located next to the Taylor Carpet Company Building. The building housed the Indianapolis News until 1949.

It was listed on the National Register of Historic Places in 1984. It is located in the Washington Street–Monument Circle Historic District.

References

Individually listed contributing properties to historic districts on the National Register in Indiana
Commercial buildings on the National Register of Historic Places in Indiana
Gothic Revival architecture in Indiana
Commercial buildings completed in 1910
Commercial buildings in Indianapolis
National Register of Historic Places in Indianapolis